American singer-songwriter, author and visual artist Bob Dylan has received many accolades throughout his long career as a songwriter and performing artist. Dylan's professional career began in 1961 when he signed with Columbia Records. Fifty-five years later, in 2016, Dylan continued to release new recordings and was the first musician to receive the Nobel Prize in Literature. Bob Dylan has also won the Presidential Medal of Freedom, given to him by the 44th president of the United States Barack Obama.

Academy Awards

GMA Dove Awards

Golden Globe Awards

Grammy Awards

|-
| 1963
| Bob Dylan
| Best Folk Recording
| 
|-
| 1965
| The Times They Are a-Changin'
| Best Folk Recording
| 
|-
| 1969
| John Wesley Harding
| Best Folk Performance
| 
|-
| 1970
| "Nashville Skyline Rag"
| Best Country Instrumental Performance
| 
|-
| 1973
| The Concert for Bangla Desh
| Album of the Year
| 
|- 
| 1974
| Pat Garrett & Billy the Kid
| Album of Best Original Score Written for a Motion Picture or a Television Special
| 
|- 
| 1980
| "Gotta Serve Somebody"
| Best Rock Vocal Performance, Male
| 
|-
| 1981
| Saved
| Best Inspirational Performance
| 
|-
| 1982
| Shot of Love
| Best Inspirational Performance
| 
|-
| 1989
| "Pretty Boy Floyd"
| Best Traditional Folk Recording
| 
|-
| rowspan=2| 1990
| rowspan=2| Traveling Wilburys Vol. 1
| Album of the Year
| 
|-
| Best Rock Performance by a Duo or Group with Vocal
| 
|- 
| 1992
| "Series of Dreams"
| Best Music Video, Short Form
| 
|-
| *
| N/A
| Lifetime Achievement Award
| 
|-
|rowspan="3" | 1994
| "All Along the Watchtower"
| Best Rock Vocal Performance, Solo
| 
|-
| "My Back Pages"
| Best Rock Vocal Performance by a Duo or Group with Vocal
| 
|-
| Good as I Been to You
| Best Contemporary Folk Album
| 
|-
| 1995
| World Gone Wrong
| Best Traditional Folk Album
| 
|-
|rowspan="3" | 1996
| "Knockin' on Heaven's Door"
| Best Male Rock Vocal Performance
| 
|-
| "Dignity"
| Best Rock Song
| 
|-
| MTV Unplugged
| Best Contemporary Folk Album
| 
|-
| rowspan=3| 1998
| rowspan=2| Time Out of Mind
| Album of the Year
| 
|-
| Best Contemporary Folk Album
| 
|-
| "Cold Irons Bound"
| Best Rock Vocal Performance, Male
| 
|-
| 1999
| "To Make You Feel My Love"
| Best Country Song
| 
|-
| rowspan=2| 2001
| rowspan=2|  "Things Have Changed"
| Best Rock Vocal Performance, Male
| 
|-
| Best Song Written for a Motion Picture, Television or Other Visual Media
| 
|-
| rowspan=3| 2002
| rowspan=2| Love and Theft
| Album of the Year
| 
|-
| Best Contemporary Folk Album
| 
|-
| "Honest with Me"
| Best Rock Vocal Performance, Male
| 
|-
| rowspan=2| 2004
| "Gonna Change My Way of Thinking"
| Best Pop Collaboration with Vocals
| 
|-
| "Down in the Flood"
| Best Rock Vocal Performance, Male
| 
|-
| rowspan=3| 2007
| rowspan=2| "Someday Baby"
| Best Solo Rock Vocal Performance
| 
|-
| Best Rock Song
| 
|-
| Modern Times
| Best Contemporary Folk/Americana Album
| 
|-
| rowspan=2| 2010
| "Beyond Here Lies Nothin'"
| Best Solo Rock Vocal Performance
| 
|-
| Together Through Life
| Best Americana Album
| 
|-
| 2016
| Shadows in the Night
| rowspan=3|Best Traditional Pop Vocal Album
| 
|-
| 2017
| Fallen Angels
| 
|-
| 2018
| Triplicate
| 
|-

Grammy Hall of Fame

Recordings of Bob Dylan were inducted into the Grammy Hall of Fame, which is a special Grammy award established in 1973 to honor recordings that are at least twenty-five years old, and that have "qualitative or historical significance."

Rock and Roll Hall of Fame

The Rock and Roll Hall of Fame inducted Bob Dylan as Performer in 1988 and listed five songs by Bob Dylan of the 500 songs that shaped rock and roll.

 1963: "Blowin' in the Wind"
 1964: "The Times They Are a-Changin’"
 1965: "Like a Rolling Stone"
 1965: "Subterranean Homesick Blues"
 1975: "Tangled Up in Blue"

Nobel Prize
Dylan was awarded the 2016 Nobel Prize in Literature on October 13, 2016, "for having created new poetic expressions within the great American song tradition". It is the first time since 1993 that the Nobel committee has offered the award in the category of American literature.

Other awards and nominations 

{| class=wikitable
|-
! Year !! Awards !! Work !! Category !! Result
|-
| 1999
| Webby Awards
| bobdylan.com 
| Websites - Music
| 
|-
| rowspan="2" | 2013
| MVPA Awards
| "Duquesne Whistle"
| Best Rock Video
| 
|-
| Antville Music Video Awards
| rowspan="7" | "Like a Rolling Stone"
| rowspan="2" | Best Interactive 
| 
|-
| rowspan="6" | 2014
| rowspan="3" | UK Music Video Awards
| 
|-
| Best Art Direction & Design
| 
|-
| Best Music AD
| 
|-
| rowspan=3|Webby Awards
| Online Film & Video - Best Editing
| 
|-
| Online Film & Video - Best Use of Interactive Video
| 
|-
| Online Film & Video - Music
|

Other honors

Footnotes

Awards
Dylan, Bob
Dylan, Bob